The Austria women's cricket team toured Italy in August 2021 to play a five-match bilateral Women's Twenty20 International (WT20I) series. The matches were played at the Roma Cricket Ground in the Spinaceto area of Rome, and were the first official WT20I matches played by Italy. A tri-nation series including Jersey had been scheduled, but they were unable to take part due to COVID-19 travel restrictions.

In July 2021, the Italian Cricket Federation organised training camps in the north and south of the country and selected a squad to represent these two areas in warm-up matches, after which a 20-player squad (including reserves) was selected. The Italians won the series opener, which was their first official WT20I match. After levelling the series on day two, Austria gained an unassailable lead by winning a double-header on the fourth day. Italy gained a consolation victory by a single run in the final match, while Austria won the series 3–2.

Squads

WT20I series

1st WT20I

2nd WT20I

3rd WT20I

4th WT20I

5th WT20I

References

External links
 Series home at ESPN Cricinfo

Associate international cricket competitions in 2021